Allan Reid may refer to:

Allan Reid (Jamaican footballer) in 2001 FIFA World Youth Championship squads
Allan Reid (cricketer), one of the South African cricket team in England in 1901
Allan Reid, winner of Juno Award for Music DVD of the Year
Allan Reid (Australian footballer) on List of Geelong Football Club players

See also
Allan Read, Bishop of Ontario
Alan Reid (disambiguation)
Alan Reed (disambiguation)
Alan Read (disambiguation)